Rahumäe railway station is a railway station serving Rahumäe, a subdistrict of the Nõmme district of Tallinn, Estonia. Rahumäe has approximately 3000 residents.

The station is approximately 6.8 kilometers (4.2 mi) southwest from the Baltic station (Estonian: Balti jaam) which is the main railway station of Tallinn, near the Baltic Sea.

The station was opened in 1926, and the station building was completed in 1930. There are two platforms along the two-track railway, both 146 meters long.

History 
Although the Tallinn-Paldiski railway opened already in 1870, a station on this site was not opened before 1926. The station building was completed in 1930. Ticket sale was terminated in the station building in 1998.

Operations 
Elron's electric trains from Tallinn to Keila, Paldiski, Turba and Klooga-Rand stop at Rahumäe station. The station belongs to the Zone I, within which traffic is free for Tallinners. In 2020, there were approximately 58 train departures per day at Rahumäe railway station towards Tallinn city center.

There is a possibility to transfer to TLT (Tallinn City Transport) bus line 36 at a bus station on Pärnu maantee and to bus line 23 at a bus station on Rahumäe tee.

See also
 List of railway stations in Estonia
 Rail transport in Estonia

References

External links

 Official website of Eesti Raudtee (EVR) – the national railway infrastructure company of Estonia  responsible for maintenance and traffic control of most of the Estonian railway network
 Official website of Elron – the national passenger train operating company of Estonia operating all domestic passenger train services

Railway stations in Estonia
Buildings and structures in Tallinn
Transport in Tallinn
Railway stations opened in 1926